The Best of Sammy Hagar is a Sammy Hagar compilation album. The album's track listing incorrectly lists "Red" as a live track when it is, in fact, the studio version.

Track listing
"Red" (John Carter/Sammy Hagar) - 4:04
"Plain Jane" (Sammy Hagar) - 3:49
"I've Done Everything for You" (Sammy Hagar) - 3:02
"Rock 'N' Roll Weekend" (Sammy Hagar) - 3:07
"This Planet's on Fire (Burn in Hell)" (Sammy Hagar) - 4:35
"You Make Me Crazy" (Sammy Hagar) - 2:47
"Trans Am (Highway Wonderland)" (Sammy Hagar) - 3:47
"(Sittin' On) The Dock of the Bay" (Steve Cropper/Otis Redding) - 3:02
"Cruisin' & Boozin'" (Sammy Hagar) - 3:10
"Bad Motor Scooter" (Sammy Hagar) - 7:07

Re-release
On June 24, 2008, this collection was released under the Collectable Records label. Artwork was stripped down and the track listing also included the erred "live" notation on the first track, "Red".

Versions 
EMI Capitol Music Special Markets (US) : 72435 21097-2-2
Collectable Records Corp (US) : COL-CD-1026

External links
Lyrics from Sammy's official site. link
 www.redrockerdiscography.com

Sammy Hagar albums
1999 compilation albums

it:The Best of Sammy Hagar